Taking Up Space: The Black Girl's Manifesto for Change is a 2019 book by Cambridge University graduates Chelsea Kwakye, who is British-Ghanaian and Ore Ogunbiyi, who is Nigerian-British. 

It discusses the lack of diversity in higher education, and addresses topics such as decolonising the curriculum, access, mental health, relationships and activism. The book includes interviews with students from UK universities about their experiences. Kwakye holds a degree in history and Ogunbiyi in human, social and political sciences. Taking Up Space was the first independent book to be published by #Merky Books, an imprint with the publishing house Penguin Random House in collaboration with grime artist Stormzy, who has a scholarship program that fund black British students to go to Cambridge University.

In 2020, Sid Gentle Films acquired the television rights to the book.

References 

2019 non-fiction books
Books about education
Books about race and ethnicity